The men's 800 metres event  at the 1996 European Athletics Indoor Championships was held in Stockholm Globe Arena on 8–10 March.

Medalists

Results

Heats
First 2 from each heat (Q) and the next 4 fastest (q) qualified for the semifinals.

Semifinals
First 2 from each semifinal (Q) and the next 2 fastest (q) qualified for the final.

Final

References

800 metres at the European Athletics Indoor Championships
800